Jefry bin Mohammad (born 13 June 1967) is a Bruneian retired footballer who played as a goalkeeper for the Brunei M-League representative team.

Jefry was the third-choice goalkeeper for Brunei in the late nineties as the pair of Yunos Yusof and Ibrahim Abu Bakar were the two established shot-stoppers for the Wasps since the mid-eighties. Yunos retired in 1999 and Ibrahim followed suit in 2000, which meant that Jefry became the first-choice goalkeeper for the national team at the turn of the century.

International career
Jefry was the goalkeeper for Brunei at the 20th SEA Games held for the first (and so far only) time in his home country. The Wasps failed to advance to the semi-final stage. This was followed by the 2000 AFC Asian Cup qualification held in Macau where Jefry conceded nine goals against Japan.

His final appearance was at the 2002 World Cup qualifying for Asia, where he played the full 90 minutes in the 0–1 defeat against India.

Personal life
He has two brothers who are also former Brunei internationals: Moksen and Irwan were his teammates when they were playing in the M-League in the late nineties.

References

External links
 
 

1967 births
Living people
Association football goalkeepers
Bruneian footballers
Brunei international footballers
Brunei (Malaysia Premier League team) players
Competitors at the 1999 Southeast Asian Games
Southeast Asian Games competitors for Brunei